Chakram is a throwing weapon from the Indian subcontinent. 

Chakram may also refer to:

Chakram (2003 film)
Chakram (2005 film)
Travancore chakram, a coin

See also

 Chakra (disambiguation)